Marian Kozłowski (6 June 1915 in Poznań – 1943 in Germany) was a Polish sprint canoeist who competed in the late 1930s. He finished 11th in the K-2 10000 m event at the 1936 Summer Olympics in Berlin.

During the German occupation of Poland he was sent to a forced labor in Germany. He died there in 1943 during Allied bombing.

References

External links
 Sports-reference.com profile

1915 births
1943 deaths
Canoeists at the 1936 Summer Olympics
Olympic canoeists of Poland
Polish male canoeists
Sportspeople from Poznań
Polish civilians killed in World War II
Deaths by airstrike during World War II
Polish World War II forced labourers